is a Japanese professional football club based in Kawasaki, Kanagawa Prefecture, south of Tokyo. The club plays in the J1 League, which is the top tier of football in the country. Their home stadium is Kawasaki Todoroki Stadium, in Nakahara Ward, in the central area of Kawasaki.

History

The club was founded in 1955 as Fujitsu Soccer Club. It was one of many city clubs that comprised the Japan Soccer League (JSL), including Yomiuri (later Tokyo Verdy 1969), Toshiba (later Consadole Sapporo) and NKK SC (now defunct). They first made the JSL Division 1 in 1977, only to be relegated the next season afterwards and would not return to the top flight until 2000, when they were first promoted to the rebranded J1.

The club co-founded the Japanese second tier three times under its three names: JSL Division 2 (1972), Japan Football League Division 1 (1992) and J.League Division 2 (1999).

Fujitsu's club became professional in 1997, and changed its name – "Frontale" means "frontal" in Italian. The club old crest and colours are based on those of Brazilian side Grêmio, because both clubs have cooperated since 26 March 1997. The club joined the second division of the J.League in 1999, and became the champion of the division. But in the next season, it sank to the bottom of J.League Division 1, and was relegated. In 2004, they were champions of J2 and won promotion to J1 for the second time. With the former rival city clubs out of the way due to relocation or liquidation, Frontale began building its power base in the city.

In 2006, they achieved runner-up position in J1, their highest league position up to that time. In 2007, this club attended the AFC Champions League, and made important success, as the first Japanese club for qualifying its group stage, before Urawa Red Diamonds. But Kawasaki lost in the quarter finals, against Iranian Sepahan, in a penalty shoot-out after two scoreless games.

At long last, after two other second-place finishes in 2008 and 2009, Kawasaki finally won the title in 2017, coming from behind to upstage bitter rivals Kashima Antlers after they were held to a draw at Júbilo Iwata, 16 seasons and 40 years after their first promotion to the top division.

Suddenly, Kawasaki started to create history on the J.League. No J1 team ever had won four titles on a five-year span. On 2020, they successfully won the J1 League with 83 points, staying 17 points clear off Gamba Osaka, the runners-up. They won the title with four games to spare, which was a record under the 34-match league format. With talents not being restricted to the starting XI, Frontale managed to get the best out of the five substitutions allowed by the J. League, per FIFA recommendation, instated after the COVID-19 outbreak. A good example was an stellar season by Kaoru Mitoma. 

On 2021, Frontale continue to assert their dominance and display great performances throughout the season. They won their first title of the year in their very opening match of the season, after beating Gamba Osaka by 3–2 on the 2021 Japanese Super Cup.

Such rise of standards, eye-catching performances, and increase of national team level players coming from Frontale led foreign clubs to caught attention on their players. Among the most marking departures, Frontale saw two major talents leaving the club mid-season. The first one being Kaoru Mitoma, who got included in the 2020 J.League Best XI in his first full season as a professional despite playing less than half of his matches as a starter for Frontale, being signed by Brighton & Hove Albion of the Premier League. The second one was Ao Tanaka. The 2020 J.League Rookie of the Year which quickly earned his spot on the starting XI after turning professional, transferring to Fortuna Düsseldorf of 2. Bundesliga on loan, which later would have his deal turning permanent. They weren't the only departures leaving a mark on the team, as they followed Hidemasa Morita to Europe, as the latter went on to sign for Santa Clara of the Primeira Liga.

However, despite Frontale having their future performances being apparently threatened after these departures, the club went on to win the 2021 J1 League with a record-breaking season, which saw them: Winning the most points on a single J1 League season ever, with 92 points won on 38 matches; Achieving the least amount of losses on a J1 League season, registering only 2 losses in total (the first J1 loss only came 6 months after the season opening); Being the joint unbeaten team at home matches in a J1 League season, equalling Urawa Red Diamonds's tally on 2006; Being the first ever J1 team to win more than 80 points on consecutive seasons. 

Leandro Damião, with 23 gols, was Frontale's individual highlight on the 2021 season, helping him win the MVP award, after being the joint league top-scorer and one of the players with the most assists of the tournament. The latter record was accomplished by another Frontale players, Miki Yamane, which also saw several call-ups for the National Team throughout the 2021 and 2022 season, alongside other Frontale players and formers players, like the team captain Shogo Taniguchi, and midfielder Yasuto Wakizaka. They joined many other players who previously were selected for the Japan national football team while playing at Frontale.  Of the selected players, some players can be highlighted, like defender Yoshinobu Minowa, who was selected in 2005. After the 2006 FIFA World Cup, midfielder Kengo Nakamura and forward Kazuki Ganaha became new Japan internationals, especially Kengo Nakamura, who being a mainstay at club and country for a long time. Long-serving for the national team, goalkeeper Eiji Kawashima was also selected while at Frontale, making his debut on the 2008 East Asian Cup. Shuhei Terada, who played all of his 13-year professional career at Frontale, was also selected for the national team from 2008 to 2009.

After five consecutive seasons winning at least one major title from 2017 to 2021, Frontale remained trophyless for the entire 2022 season. Taking their previous overall season into account, the club went through an uninspired season, which saw early eliminations in all four competitions the club played that involved knockout-stage formats. On February, the club already saw their first match of the season resulting on a defeat, after losing 2–0 by Urawa Red Diamonds at the Super Cup. On April, the club was eliminated at the 2022 AFC Champions League at its group stage, finishing their group as runners-up, behind Malaysian champions Johor Darul Ta'zim. On June, at the Emperor's Cup, Frontale were unexpectedly eliminated, at the third round of the competition, after being defeated by J2 League club Tokyo Verdy by 1–0. 

On the latter half of the season, Frontale continued an atypically poor run of form. On August, the club started their campaign at the J.League Cup, entering the competition late in the double-legged quarter-finals, after receiving a bye from the early stages of the competition due to their AFC Champions League qualification. The club played this quarter-finals against Cerezo Osaka, and was awarded the hosting rights of the tie's second leg. Despite not losing any of the two legs, Frontale didn't won any, either. At Cerezo, the match ended 1–1, giving a theoric relief for Frontale, who only needed a 0–0 draw or a win to proceed in the competition. Frontale started the second leg winning 2–0, with Marcinho scoring two goals at the 40th and 53rd minute. Surprisingly, Frontale collapsed at the dying minutes of the match, conceding two heading goals from Mutsuki Kato and Hiroto Yamada at the 90th and 95th minute, respectively. 

Following the elimination at the J.League Cup, only the J1 League title was then available for Frontale to chase. Oscillating placements throughout the campaign, the club still managed to finish five separate matchweeks at the top of the league in the first half of the season. On the second half of the season, though, never again did Frontale get past the second place. Serving as a minor consolation for their season, the club held to a hardly-fought title chase alongside Sanfrecce Hiroshima (until the closing matchweeks). On December, at the 38th round, the last round of the season, Frontale were narrow two points away from first-placed Yokohama F. Marinos. A 13-goal difference was also in Frontale's way, meaning that in the more realistic scenario, Frontale needed to win their match and expect Marinos to lose theirs. Playing the round against FC Tokyo, Frontale were early threatened with a red card, as Jung Sung-ryong was sent off a few minutes after Frontale's first goal. Despite playing the rest of the match with 10 players, Frontale still managed to win past FC Tokyo by 3–2. Playing against Vissel Kobe, Marinos won the match by 3–1, and then were handed the J1 League title. On the plus side, finishing as the league's runners-up led the club to qualify for the 2023–24 AFC Champions League, entering the competition in the group stage.

Colour, sponsors and manufacturers

Kit evolution

Records and statistics

Players

Current squad
. 

Out on loan

Reserve squad (U-18s)
; Squad for the 2022 season: 

Personnel awards

J.League Player of the Year
 Kengo Nakamura (2016)
 Yu Kobayashi (2017)
 Akihiro Ienaga (2018)
 Leandro Damião (2021)

J.League Top Scorer
 Juninho (2008)
 Yoshito Ōkubo (2013, 2014, 2015)
 Yu Kobayashi (2017)
 Leandro Damião (2021)

J.League Best Eleven
 Kengo Nakamura (2006, 2007, 2008, 2009, 2010, 2016, 2017, 2018)
 Hiroyuki Taniguchi (2006)
 Juninho (2007)
 Eiji Kawashima (2009)
 Yoshito Ōkubo (2013, 2014, 2015)
 Yu Kobayashi (2016, 2017)
 Shintaro Kurumaya (2017, 2018)
 Elsinho (2017, 2018)
 Shogo Taniguchi (2018, 2020, 2021, 2022)
 Akihiro Ienaga (2018, 2020, 2021, 2022)
 Jung Sung-ryong (2018, 2020)
 Ryota Oshima (2018)
 Miki Yamane (2020, 2021, 2022)
 Jesiel (2020, 2021)
 Hidemasa Morita (2020)
 Kaoru Mitoma (2020)
 Kyohei Noborizato (2020)
 Ao Tanaka (2020)
 Leandro Damião (2021)
 Yasuto Wakizaka (2021, 2022)
 Reo Hatate (2021)
 Marcinho (2022)

J.League Rookie of the Year
 Ao Tanaka (2019)

World Cup players
The following players have been selected by their country in the World Cup, while playing for Kawasaki Frontale:
 Kengo Nakamura (2010)
 Junichi Inamoto (2010)
 Eiji Kawashima (2010)
 Jong Tae-Se (2010)
 Yoshito Ōkubo (2014)
 Ryota Oshima (2018)
 Shogo Taniguchi (2022)
 Miki Yamane (2022)

Olympic players
The following players have represented their country at the Summer Olympic Games whilst playing for Kawasaki Frontale:
 Hiroyuki Taniguchi (2008)
 Shunsuke Ando (2012)
 Riki Harakawa (2016)
 Ryota Oshima (2016)
 Ao Tanaka (2020)
 Kaoru Mitoma  (2020)
 Reo Hatate  (2020)

Club officials

 Honours 
As Fujitsu SC (1955–1996) and Kawasaki Frontale (1997–present)
League
J1 League (first tier)
Champions (4): 2017, 2018, 2020, 2021
Japan Soccer League Division 2/J2 League (second tier)
Champions (3): 1976, 1999, 2004
Kanto Soccer League
 Champions (1): 1968
Cup
Emperor's Cup
Winners (1): 2020
J.League Cup
Winners (1): 2019
Japanese Super Cup
Winners (2): 2019, 2021

Managerial history
Managers of the club since 1997

League history
Regional (Kanto Soccer League): 1967–71 (as Fujitsu)
Division 2 (JSL Div. 2): 1972–76 (as Fujitsu)
Division 1 (JSL Div. 1): 1977–78
Division 2 (JSL Div. 2): 1979–91
Division 2 (former JFL Div. 1): 1992–98 (as Fujitsu 1992–95; Fujitsu Kawasaki 1996; Kawasaki Frontale 1997–)
Division 2 (J2): 1999
Division 1 (J1): 2000
Division 2 (J2): 2001–04
Division 1 (J1): 2005–

Total (as of 2021): 20 seasons in the top tier, 30 seasons in the second tier and 5 seasons in the Regional Leagues.

Rivalries
Frontale's rivalry with FC Tokyo is known as the Tamagawa Clásico (using the Spanish word "Clásico"'' as used in derbies in Spain and Latin America). The two clubs first met in 1991 in the old Japan Soccer League Division 2 and were rivals for promotion to the J.League in the 1990s. They co-founded the new J2 League in 1999 and were promoted together the same year, and although Frontale were immediately relegated, they were promoted again in 2005 and have regularly met since then.

Frontale also has a Tamagawa rivalry with Tokyo Verdy 1969, which was originally also based in Kawasaki and moved to Chofu, Tokyo in 2000. The two were co-founders of the JSL Division 2 in 1972 and, although spent 20 seasons (1979 to 1999) in separate tiers, rekindled the rivalry in the late 1990s as Kawasaki fans deserted Verdy to support Frontale, seen as a more community-focused club, and since then their fortunes have reversed as Frontale is a top flight mainstay while Verdy sunk into the second tier beginning in 2005.

Other rivals include Kashima Antlers, Urawa Red Diamonds, Yokohama F. Marinos and Shonan Bellmare.

Notes

References

External links

Kawasaki Frontale Official site 

 
J.League clubs
Japan Soccer League clubs
Football clubs in Japan
Association football clubs established in 1955
Sport in Kawasaki, Kanagawa
Fujitsu
1955 establishments in Japan
Japan Football League (1992–1998) clubs
Japanese League Cup winners
Emperor's Cup winners